CA3 may refer to:
 Carbonic anhydrase III, muscle specific, a human gene
 Cornu Ammonis region 3, one of the hippocampal subfields

CA-3 may refer to:
 Buhl-Verville CA-3 Airster
 Buhl CA-3 Airsedan
 CAC CA-3 Wirraway
 California's 3rd congressional district
 California State Route 3

Ca.3 may refer to :
 Caproni Ca.3, an Italian heavy bomber of World War I and the post-war era